Luther Brown is a Canadian choreographer/artistic director. Born in Kingston, Jamaica, and raised in Toronto, Ontario, he is best known as a hip hop dance choreographer for movies, television and commercials. Brown is a regular choreographer for the television dance competition So You Think You Can Dance and So You Think You Can Dance Canada, for which he was a choreographer and a judge. Brown is a co-founder of Do Dat Entertainment.

In addition to his television work, Brown has choreographed over 100 music videos for artists including Janet Jackson, P.Diddy, Jully Black, Shawn Desman, Alicia Keys, Brandy, Christina Aguilera, Nicki Minaj and Big Bang.

Early life and education
Brown's father ran a community radio show, The Caribbean Crucible, on Toronto's 105.5 FM, then the York University radio station. Brown later stated that helping his father gave him an ear for music. Throughout high school he was active in dance and step teams, as well as being a songwriter.

Brown continued to develop his choreographic style with the step dance squad he founded while studying at the University of Windsor.

Career
While still in university, Brown began to choreograph for many important artists in the Toronto hip-hop community of the 1990s. This included shows for Jully Black, Michie Mee, Dream Warriors and Maestro Fresh Wes. In 2003, he found his first opportunity to choreograph for American performers when he was invited to work on a music video for the rappers Cam'ron and Mase.

In 2007 Brown was awarded Outstanding Choreography in a Commercial from the Choreography Media Awards for his work with Nike.

Beginning in 2008, Brown worked as a judge and choreographer for the Canadian version of the television show So You Think You Can Dance. He was a choreographer for the final season of the American version. He has also made guest appearances on the X-Factor, Making the Band 4 and the Canadian TV show The Next Step.

In 2013, Brown worked with the Korean Boy Band BigBang.

Brown is a dedicated dance teacher who teaches internationally in venues ranging from community centres and high schools to large-scale dance conventions.

Choreography for So You Think You Can Dance

References

Canadian choreographers
So You Think You Can Dance choreographers
Canadian male dancers
Living people
People from Kingston, Jamaica
Black Canadian broadcasters
People from Toronto
So You Think You Can Dance Canada
Participants in Canadian reality television series
Jamaican emigrants to Canada
1973 births
Black Canadian dancers